Pier Donato Cesi may refer to:

 Pier Donato Cesi (1521–1586), Italian Catholic cardinal
 Pier Donato Cesi (1583–1656) (1583–1651), Italian Catholic cardinal